The 2023 Asian Le Mans Series was the eleventh season of the Automobile Club de l'Ouest's Asian Le Mans Series. It was the fourth 24 Hours of Le Mans-based series created by the ACO, following the American Le Mans Series (since merged with the Rolex Sports Car Series to form the United SportsCar Championship), the European Le Mans Series and the FIA World Endurance Championship. The four-event season began at the Dubai Autodrome in Dubai on 11 February 2023 and end at the Yas Marina Circuit in Abu Dhabi on 19 February 2023.

For the first time, a bronze-rated driver is mandatory in each class and only the bronze drivers can participate in qualifying, hence the LMP2 Am and GT Am subclasses would officially be dropped for this season.

Calendar
The calendar for the 2023 season was announced on the official website 25 May 2022. This Asian Le Mans Series season will once again run in its entirety in the Middle East, in the United Arab Emirates at the Dubai Autodrome in Dubai and Yas Marina Circuit in Abu Dhabi in February 2023, due to the significant freight issues.

The season will continue to comprise four four-hour length races, run on the two circuits.

Entry list

LMP2
All cars in the LMP2 class use the Gibson GK428 V8 engine and Goodyear tyres.

Notes:
 Ben Barnicoat was scheduled to compete for 99 Racing, but withdrew prior to the start of the season. He was replaced by Neel Jani. The team's nominated bronze-rated driver, Félix Porteiro, also had to withdraw after he was retroactively reclassified as a silver shortly before the event. Warren Hughes was initially called up to replace the Spaniard, but a documentation issue for the Briton resulted in Gonçalo Gomes eventually being drafted in. Gomes was later replaced with Ahmad Al Harthy for round 2.

LMP3
All cars in the LMP3 class use the Nissan VK56DE 5.6 L V8 engine and Michelin tyres.

GT

Notes:
 Richard Heistand was scheduled to compete for Walkenhorst Motorsport, but withdrew prior to the start of the season. He was replaced by Thomas Merrill.

Results
Bold indicates overall winner.

Teams Championships
Points are awarded according to the following structure:

LMP2 Teams Championship

LMP3 Teams Championship

GT Teams Championship

Driver's championships
Points are awarded according to the following structure:

LMP2 Drivers Championship

LMP3 Drivers Championship

GT Drivers Championship

Notes

References

External links
 

 
Asian Le Mans
Asian Le Mans
Asian Le Mans
Asian Le Mans